Memorial Square is a neighborhood located in Springfield, Massachusetts.

A predominantly Puerto Rican neighborhood with several parks, Memorial Square is within walking distance to Springfield's three nationally ranked hospitals, Baystate Medical Center, Shriner's Children's Hospital, and Mercy Medical.

Always a neighborhood of immigrants, Memorial Square was a primarily Greek neighborhood from the Industrial Revolution until the Great Latino Immigration of the 1980s-present. The architecturally brilliant St. George's Greek Orthodox Cathedral, founded in 1907, built in 1940, is a testament to Memorial Square's past as a vibrant Greek enclave.

A portion of the neighborhood was listed on the National Register of Historic Places in 1977 as the Memorial Square District.

References

Neighborhoods in Springfield, Massachusetts